Heilsbronn station is a railway station in the municipality of Heilsbronn, located in the Ansbach district in Bavaria, Germany. The station is on the Nuremberg–Crailsheim line of Deutsche Bahn.

Notable places nearby
Heilsbronn Abbey

References

Railway stations in Bavaria
Buildings and structures in Ansbach (district)
Nuremberg S-Bahn stations